IEX is used as an abbreviation or name for several unrelated exchanges:
 Investors Exchange, more commonly IEX, is an alternate stock exchange founded by Brad Katsuyama
 Irish Enterprise Exchange, see List of European stock exchanges
 Indian Energy Exchange, an Indian power trading exchange

IEX may also refer to:
 Internet Explorer 10, a web browser from Microsoft
 Ion exchange